The State of Tripura has a long history. The Twipra Kingdom at its peak included the whole eastern region of Bongal from the Brahmaputra River  in the north and west, the Bay of Bengal in the south and Burma to the east during the 14th and 15th centuries AD.   

The last ruler of the princely state of Tripura was Kirit Bikram Kishore Manikya Bahadur Debbarma who reigned from 1947 to 1949 Agartala after whom the kingdom was merged with India on 9 September 1949, and the administration was taken over on 15 October 1949.

Tripura became a Union Territory on 1 July 1963, and attained the status of a full-fledged state on 21 January 1972.

Prehistorical period

The origins of the kingdom are shrouded in the stories written in Rajmala, the chronicle of the Kings of Tripura, which meanders from Hindu traditional histories and Tripuri folklores.

Ancient period
The ancient period can be said to be from around the 7th century when the Tripuri kings ruled from Kailashahar in North Tripura and they used "fa" as their title; "pha" in Tripuri means "father" or "head".

Medieval period
The Kings of Tripura adopted the "manikya" title and shifted their capital to Udaipur (formerly Rangamati) on the banks of the River Gomti in Gomti District, Tripura in the 14th century. In this period their power and fame was even acknowledged by the Mughals, who were their contemporaries in North India.

Modern period

The modern period starts after the domination of the kingdom by the Mughals and the further tribute to British India after the British defeated the Mughals.

British Colonial period (1851-1949 CE) 

In 1871, the British Indian government appointed an agent to assist the Maharaja in the administration. During this period the capital of the kingdom was shifted to Agartala, in West Tripura, the present state capital in the early part of 19th century. The rulers of Tripura built palaces including the Ujjayanta Palace and Neermahal Palace.

Post-Independence (1947 CE - present) 
After India's independence, the princely state of Tripura was merged with the Union of India on 15 October 1949. Tripura became a Union Territory on 1 July 1963, and attained the status of a full-fledged state on 21 January 1972.

See also
Twipra
Kings of Tripura
Tripuri people
Manikya Dynasty
Ujjayanta Palace
Neermahal
Tripura (mythology)

References

Citations

Bibliography

External links